Western Stars is the nineteenth studio album by American singer-songwriter Bruce Springsteen, released on June 14, 2019, by Columbia Records. It was produced by Ron Aniello, who worked with Springsteen on his two previous albums: Wrecking Ball (2012) and High Hopes (2014).

The album was a chart success in the United States—where it became Springsteen's 20th top-10 album—and abroad. It was also met with widespread acclaim from critics, who found the music elegiac and evocative of the American West.

A full performance of the album was filmed and released by Warner Bros. Pictures. The soundtrack of this movie (Western Stars – Songs from the Film) has an almost identical track list and was released in September 2019.

Background
Springsteen stated in April 2019 that the album was influenced by "Southern California pop music" of the 1970s, including artists such as Glen Campbell and Burt Bacharach. Upon announcing the album in April 2019, he called it "a return to my solo recordings featuring character-driven songs and sweeping, cinematic orchestral arrangements", with a press release characterizing it as about a "range of American themes, of highways and desert spaces, of isolation and community and the permanence of home and hope".

Marketing
"Hello Sunshine" was released on April 26, 2019, as the album's lead single, along with a music video. "There Goes My Miracle" was released as the album's second single on May 17. The album's third single, "Tucson Train", was released on May 30, along with a music video directed by Thom Zimny. A music video for the album's fourth single, "Western Stars", also directed by Zimny, was released on June 14. A limited edition 7" vinyl double A-side single, featuring "Western Stars" and "The Wayfarer", was released on Black Friday Record Store Day on November 29, 2019.

Western Stars was released by Columbia on June 14, 2019. The following week, it debuted at number two on the US Billboard 200 with 66,000 album-equivalent units sold, of which 62,000 were pure album sales. It is Springsteen's 20th US top 10 album.

A documentary film, which marked Springsteen's directorial debut and features a full performance of the album, premiered at the Toronto International Film Festival in September 2019, with a wide theatrical release in October 2019 along with an accompanying soundtrack for the film. Springsteen did not tour for the album and announced that he would  shift focus towards recording a new studio album with the E Street Band in the fall of 2019.

Critical reception

Western Stars was met with widespread critical acclaim. At Metacritic, which assigns a weighted average score out of 100 to reviews and ratings from selected mainstream critics, the album received an average score of 84, based on 31 reviews.

Reviewing for Rolling Stone in May 2019, Will Hermes said that, while several songs "straddle the classic and the cliché", the album's music "evokes country-tinged California pop from the Sixties and Seventies, sounding like nothing [Springsteen]'s done before". In Entertainment Weekly, Maura Johnston applauded Springsteen for "transforming the enormous into the intimate" on the album, while The Independents Mark Beaumont said the "sumptuous, cinematic album is nothing short of a late-period masterpiece" for the musician. Writing for NME, Thomas Smith regarded Western Stars as "majestic in its scale, but traditional in its subject matter and narratives … a wonderful thing." Pat Carty in Hot Press described the album as a "heartbreaking yet life-affirmingly beautiful record - both elegiac and warm, a trick few others, if any, could pull off." Sam Sodomsky from Pitchfork said, "Springsteen returns with elegiac and wise songwriting conjuring the golden expanse of the American West; it’s his best studio album in years." In the opinion of AllMusic's Stephen Thomas Erlewine, "This isn't a piece of nostalgia on Springsteen's part, though. These references deepen a collection of songs that are sweet, sad, and searching, songs that feel finely etched on their own terms but gather a deep, lasting resonance when collected on this enchanting album." The songs were also regarded by Alexis Petridis as "strong enough to withstand the treatment" and rarely reducing themselves to pastiches of "the grownup American pop of Glen Campbell's collaborations with Jimmy Webb or Harry Nilsson's [recordings] of 'Everybody's Talkin'' and 'I Guess the Lord Must Be in New York City'." Writing in The Guardian, Petridis hoped Springsteen will "take more stylistic detours in the future", as "it adds up to an album that manages to be both unexpected and of a piece with its author’s back catalogue."

Some reviewers had reservations about the album. In his "Consumer Guide" column, Robert Christgau deemed it a worthy effort and cited its highlights as "Tucson Train" and "Moonlight Motel". However, he believed Springsteen was trying to put across the message that "America used to be better", which the critic said brings to question in what manner will fans receive the musician's nostalgia for America's past: "How many of his faithful will blame it on the rich and how many on the young?" Ludovic Hunter-Tilney issued different complaints in his review for the Financial Times, being especially critical of the record's roots rock and orchestral pop setting. "The combination of twanging western rock and orchestra has a confected, forced feel", he said, adding that "the effect is intended to dignify the lives of the hard-bitten individuals in his lyrics, but instead it sounds like they are being smothered by overbearing string and horn arrangements."

Track listing

The film version has the same track list, with the addition of the cover song "Rhinestone Cowboy".

Personnel

Musicians

 Bruce Springsteen – vocals, acoustic guitar, glockenspiel, synth strings, banjo, percussion, electric guitar, B3, piano, orchestral samples, celeste, organ solo, 12-string guitar, Mellotron
 Patti Scialfa – vocals (tracks 2, 8, 9, 11), vocal arrangement (tracks 2, 8, 9, 11)
 Ron Aniello – upright bass, piano, electric guitar, percussion, vibraphone, bass guitar, synth strings, orchestral samples, acoustic guitar, drums, B3, celeste, loops, synth, background vocal
 Charlie Giordano – accordion (track 5), piano (track 9)
 David Sancious – piano (track 2), B3 (track 6)
 Matt Rollings – piano (tracks 3, 4, 8, 13)
 Jon Brion – drums (track 13), timpani (tracks 10, 11), electric guitar (track 4), Moog (track 4, 5, 11), Farfisa (track 5), celeste (track 13)
 Gunnar Olsen – drums (tracks 3, 5, 6, 8, 10, 11)
 Matt Chamberlain – drums (track 2, 4, 12)
 Marc Muller – lap steel (track 4), pedal steel (tracks 6, 7, 12)
 Rob Lebret – electric guitar (track 4), baritone guitar (track 4)
 Marty Rifkin – pedal steel (track 9)
 Greg Leisz – pedal steel (track 13)
 Lenny Castro – conga (tracks 4, 5), tambourine (tracks 4, 11), shaker (tracks 5, 11)
 Toby Scott – loop (track 3), programming (track 3)
 Soozie Tyrell – background vocal (tracks 2, 8, 9), violin (track 9)
 Michelle Moore – background vocal (tracks 4, 11)
 Curtis King – background vocal (track 4)
 Cindy Mizelle – background vocals (track 4)
 Matthew Koma – background vocal (track 11)
 Curt Ramm – trumpet (tracks 2–5, 8, 11), flugelhorn (track 2)
 Barry Danielian – trumpet (tracks 3–5, 7, 8, 11)
 Clark Gayton – trombone (tracks 5, 8, 11)
 Dan Levine – trombone (tracks 3, 4)
 Ed Manion – saxophone (track 5)
 Rachel Drehmann – French horn (tracks 2–4, 7, 10)
 Leelanee Sterrett – French horn (tracks 2–4, 7, 10)
 Alden Banta – bassoon (tracks 3, 4)
 Andrew Sterman – alto flute (tracks 3, 4)
 Charles Pillow – oboe (tracks 3, 4)
 Luis Villalobos – violin (track 6, 10)
 Avatar Strings (tracks 1, 7, 8, 10, 12):
 Rob Mathes – conductor, arranger
 Sandy Park – contractor
 Lisa Kim (concertmaster), Hyunju Lee, Joanna Maurer, Sharon Yamada, Annaliesa Place, Suzanne Ornstein, Liz Lim, Jung Sun Yoo, Emily Popham – violins
 Robert Rinehart, Vivek Kamath, Desiree Elsevier – violas
 Alan Stepansky, Nathan Vickery – cellos
 Stone Hill Strings (tracks 2–4, 6, 11):
 Scott Tibbs – conductor
 Sandy Park – contractor
 Lisa Kim (concertmaster), Hyunju Lee, Joanna Maurer – violins
 Shmuel Katz, Rebecca Young – violas
 Alan Stepansky – cello

Technical

 Ron Aniello, Bruce Springsteen – production
 Rob Lebret, Ross Petersen, Toby Scott, Ron Aniello – engineering
 Brett Rouche, Greg Koller, Alec Dixon, Rob Lebret, Ross Petersen, Chris Steffen – additional engineering
 James Brown – additional engineering (track 9)
 Tom Elmhirst – mixing
 Joe Visciano – assistant
 Bob Ludwig – mastering
 Toby Scott – production coordinator
 Shari Sutcliffe – musician contractor
 Kevin Buell – guitars and technical services
 Michelle Holme – art and design
 Kalle Gustafsson (Trunk Archive) – cover photography
 Danny Clinch – additional photography

Charts

Weekly charts

Year-end charts

Certifications

Film
It was announced on July 23, 2019, that Springsteen would world premiere his co-directed film, Western Stars, at the 2019 Toronto International Film Festival. The film marks the first directing credit for Springsteen and was co-directed by his longtime collaborator Thom Zimny. The film features Springsteen and his backing band and orchestra performing the music from the album to a live audience. The live performances were filmed during two nights in April 2019 in a historic barn on the artist's property, the outdoor sequences were filmed at Joshua Tree National Park.

Cameron Bailey, artistic director of the festival, said of the film, "We have Bruce Springsteen's directorial debut at the festival, I think he's got a big future ahead of him. It's largely performance, but there is a framing to it. It's very filmic, which is what attracted me. The album and the film are both about this fading Western movie B-level star who's looking back on his life and the decisions he's made. That narrative and that character shape all the songs. In between the songs, you've got Bruce really talking about this character he invented, the story he wrote for the character, and how it reflects back on his own life as he ages and other kind of narratives he's had in his previous albums."

Warner Bros. Pictures released the film on October 25, 2019. The companion soundtrack for the movie, titled Western Stars – Songs from the Film, was released on the same day by Columbia Records.

Charts

References

External links
 

2019 albums
Bruce Springsteen albums
Columbia Records albums
Albums produced by Ron Aniello
Country pop albums
Orchestral pop albums
Pop rock albums by American artists
Country rock albums by American artists